2017–18 Zonal T20 League was a Twenty20 cricket competition in India. It was played from 7 to 16 January 2018. It was the second edition of the tournament, following the 2016–17 Inter State Twenty-20 Tournament held in January and February 2017.

Top 2 teams from each Zone qualified for the Super League stage of 2017–18 Syed Mushtaq Ali Trophy.

On 14 January, in the North Zone fixture between Himachal Pradesh and Delhi, Rishabh Pant scored the second-fastest century in a Twenty20 match, making 100 from 32 balls.

Points Table

West Zone

Central Zone

South Zone

East Zone

North Zone

Fixtures

West Zone

Central Zone

South Zone

East Zone

North Zone

References

External links
 Series at ESPN Cricinfo

Zonal T20 League
Zonal T20 League